Natalie Brown is a Canadian actress and model.

Career
Brown landed her first print campaign for Bonne Bell at age 16 and went on to become the Heinz Ketchup girl. She also modeled for Noxema and Max Factor, and studied fine arts at York University.

She played talent agent Sophie Parker on the television sitcom Sophie, which ran for two seasons, and grieving mother Carol Haplin on six of the eight episodes of the ABC series Happy Town. Her other credits include ReGenesis, Naked Josh, Mutant X, Zoe Busiek: Wild Card, Something Beneath, Dawn of the Dead, Welcome to Mooseport, How to Lose a Guy in 10 Days, MTV's Undressed, Tracker, Flashpoint, Dark Matter and The Strain. In the 2016 Hallmark original movie For Love & Honor, she played a dean at a military school.  

She is also known in Canada for her work in television commercials, particularly those for Baileys Irish Cream, Salon Selectives, Canada Post, and Yoplait.

Filmography

Film

Television

Video Game

Awards and nominations

References

External links
 
 Our Public Airwaves.ca
 Toro Magazine Interview, June 2008
 Natalie Brown interview on Sophie – AOL Entertainment

Canadian film actresses
Canadian television actresses
Canadian voice actresses
People from Timmins
Actresses from Ontario
Living people
1973 births